Cacopsylla is a genus of bugs in the Psyllidae family, the jumping plant lice. The genus includes most of the psylla harmful to fruit trees.

Species 
 Cacopsylla abdominalis
 Cacopsylla acuminata
 Cacopsylla affinis
 Cacopsylla alaskensis
 Cacopsylla alaterni
 Cacopsylla alba
 Cacopsylla albagena
 Cacopsylla albipes
 Cacopsylla ambigua
 Cacopsylla americana
 Cacopsylla annulata
 Cacopsylla arctica
 Cacopsylla atlantica
 Cacopsylla bagnalli
 Cacopsylla bidens
 Cacopsylla breviantennata
 Cacopsylla breviata
 Cacopsylla brevistigmata
 Cacopsylla brunneipennis
 Cacopsylla bulbosa
 Cacopsylla confusa
 Cacopsylla consobrina
 Cacopsylla corcontum
 Cacopsylla coryli
 Cacopsylla costalis
 Cacopsylla crataegi
 Cacopsylla cretica
 Cacopsylla curta
 Cacopsylla difficilis
 Cacopsylla dilonchi
 Cacopsylla elaeagni
 Cacopsylla elaeagnicola
 Cacopsylla elegans
 Cacopsylla elegantissima
 Cacopsylla elegantula
 Cacopsylla exima
 Cacopsylla fasciata
 Cacopsylla fatsiae
 Cacopsylla fibulata
 Cacopsylla flori
 Cacopsylla groenlandica
 Cacopsylla haliaeeti
 Cacopsylla hamata
 Cacopsylla highwoodensis
 Cacopsylla hippophaes
 Cacopsylla hirsuta
 Cacopsylla incerta
 Cacopsylla insignita
 Cacopsylla intacta
 Cacopsylla intermedia
 Cacopsylla iranica
 Cacopsylla iteophila
 Cacopsylla jenseni
 Cacopsylla kananaskensis
 Cacopsylla latiforceps
 Cacopsylla ledi
 Cacopsylla limbata
 Cacopsylla longiforceps
 Cacopsylla macleani
 Cacopsylla maculata
 Cacopsylla magna
 Cacopsylla magnicauda
 Cacopsylla mali
 Cacopsylla manisi
 Cacopsylla mariannae
 Cacopsylla media
 Cacopsylla melanoneura
 Cacopsylla minor
 Cacopsylla minuta
 Cacopsylla moscovita
 Cacopsylla myrthi
 Cacopsylla myrtilli
 Cacopsylla nana
 Cacopsylla negundinis
 Cacopsylla nigranervosa
 Cacopsylla nigrita
 Cacopsylla nordica
 Cacopsylla notapennis
 Cacopsylla notata
 Cacopsylla omani
 Cacopsylla palmeni
 Cacopsylla parallela
 Cacopsylla pararibesiae
 Cacopsylla parvipennis
 Cacopsylla peregrina
 Cacopsylla permixta
 Cacopsylla perrieri
 Cacopsylla phlebophyllae
 Cacopsylla picta
 Cacopsylla propinqua
 Cacopsylla propria
 Cacopsylla pruni
 Cacopsylla pulchella
 Cacopsylla pulchra
 Cacopsylla pyri
 Cacopsylla pyricola
 Cacopsylla pyrisuga
 Cacopsylla quadrilineata
 Cacopsylla rara
 Cacopsylla rhamnicola
 Cacopsylla rhododendri
 Cacopsylla ribesiae
 Cacopsylla ribis
 Cacopsylla rufipennis
 Cacopsylla saliceti
 Cacopsylla saligna
 Cacopsylla septentrionalis
 Cacopsylla sinuata
 Cacopsylla sorbi
 Cacopsylla spiculata
 Cacopsylla striata
 Cacopsylla stricklandi
 Cacopsylla subspiculata
 Cacopsylla suturalis
 Cacopsylla talhouki
 Cacopsylla tatrica
 Cacopsylla tenuata
 Cacopsylla toolikensis
 Cacopsylla tuthilli
 Cacopsylla ulmi
 Cacopsylla urticaecolens
 Cacopsylla usitata
 Cacopsylla viburni
 Cacopsylla visci
 Cacopsylla vondraceki
 Cacopsylla yosemitensis
 Cacopsylla zaicevi
 Cacopsylla zetterstedti

References

External links 
 
 

Psyllidae
Psylloidea genera